Active was a snow launched in New Brunswick in 1789, possibly under another name. She first appeared in Lloyd's Register in the volume for 1793. She traded as a West Indiaman, sailing between Bristol and Jamaica.

In April 1795 Lloyd's List reported that the French corvette Jean Bart had captured Active as Active was sailing from Bristol to Jamaica. The French took Actives crew on board Jean Bart and then burnt Active. Shortly thereafter the Royal Navy captured Jean Bart.

Citations

1789 ships
Age of Sail merchant ships of England
Captured ships